Klubi i Futbollit Tirana B is an Albanian football club based in Tirana. The club is the B team of Albania's most successful club KF Tirana. It was founded in 1932, but was dissolved before it was refounded on 22 January 2013.

History
In 1932, ahead of the Albanian First Division campaign that was to take place, Sportklub Tiranë decided to put together a reserve team to participate in the first officially recognised reserves competition held in Albania. They competed in Group A along with reserve teams of Teuta Durrës, Bashkimi Shkodran, SK Elbasani and Skënderbeu Korçë. Sportklub Tiranë B, as the club was known at the time won the competition, but were not eligible to compete in the championship finals for the main Albanian First Division title and promotion to the Albanian Superliga. The following year the Albanian Football Association held the same competition, in which Sportklub Tiranë B won once again in the second and final year. The team dissolved in 1933 and the players either joined the youth team of Sportklub Tiranë or the first team. New B teams were recreated over the years, notably in 1980 where a team was recreated in order to compete in a friendly cup competition held by the Albanian Football Association, in which the team won.

On 22 January 2013, the first KF Tirana reserve team was founded as a result of a decision undertaken by the Municipality of Tirana to restructure the club's academy system and to improve the efficiency and image of the club. The team was formed to allow younger players to gain first team experience in the lower divisions of Albanian football, and also for first team players to prepare for first team games through featuring in reserve games as players from the first team, under-19s and under-17s are eligible to play for the B team. The club was registered to the Albanian Football Association on the same day as its foundation, and they competed in the Albanian Third Division in the 2012–13 season, which is the fourth and lowest tier of the Albanian Football Association competitions.

Activity
The club's first manager was named former KF Tirana player Ardian Mema, who guided the club to a third-place finish in the 2012–13 Albanian Third Division campaign. The following season the club finished top of Group A and reached the championship final against Teuta Durrës B, in which they won 2–0 through a brace scored by Franci Kosova, which handed KF Tirana B their first officially recognised honour and promotion to the Albanian Second Division only one year after creation.

Since promotion, however, Tirana B have not been able to gain promotion to a higher division. This is due to the fact that the club has currently been focused on its first team and academy. This has resulted in it failing to circulate players of all abilities and not fulfilling the purpose of this secondary clubs creation.

Stadium
KF Tirana plays most of its league and friendly games at the Selman Stërmasi stadium in Tirana. The Selman Stërmasi Stadium was built in 1956 and had been named the 'Dinamo' Stadium until 1991 when it was permanently given its new name. The Football Association of Albania and the club decided to name the stadium in 1991 after the eminent KF Tirana player, coach and president, Selman Stërmasi. The stadium has a capacity of 12,500 (of which 6,000 can be seated) and has ended a long phase of construction, involving development of the main pitch, central seated area, facilities around the ground and general lineaments. There are still improvements expected to be made soon. These include a side seated areas, an electronic clock and a KF Tirana shopping centre just under the central seating. The internal facilities include a press conference room, journalists' corner and modern showers. The main parking area is located at the front of the stadium, which leads to the entrance. The external part of the stadium is surrounded by a 9 ft rail fence.

Honours
Albanian Third Division
Winners (1): 2013–14
Albanian First Division Exhibition
Winners (2): 1932, 1933
Albanian Football Association Cup
Winners (1): 1980

Current squad

Managers
 Ardian Mema (22 January 2013 – 30 June 2013)
 Ilir Muça (30 June 2013– 1 September 2015)
 Krenar Alimehmeti (1 September 2015– 1 December 2016)
 Migen Memelli (1 December 2016- 1 July 2017)
 Krenar Alimehmeti (1 July 2017– 1 August 2018)
 Alpin Gallo (1 August 2018– 1 November 2018)
  Bekim Jakupi (1 November 2018 — 1 January 2019)
  Johanes Tafaj (1 January 2019 — 11 November 2020 )
 Arber Abilaliaj (12 November 2020 — 07 December 2020 )
  Olsi Uku (12 December 2020 — 25 January 2021 )
 Arber Abilaliaj (26 January 2021 — 30 June 2021  )
 Erbim Fagu (1 July 2021 — 10 June 2022 )

Current technical staff
 President:  Refik Halili
 Club Secretary  Tefik Osmani
 Head Coach:   Arber Abilaliaj
 Athletic Trainer:  Kostantinos Gianis
 Academy  Devi Muka
 Goalkeeping Coach:  Alfred Osmani
 Physiotherapist:  Tedi Maqellari
 Physiotherapist:  Arzen Voci

Recent seasons

References

External links
 Panorama Sport

B Tean
Football clubs in Albania
Football clubs in Tirana
Association football clubs established in 2013
2013 establishments in Albania
Reserve team football in Albania
Albanian Third Division clubs